Clos du Val Winery is a winery in the Stags Leap District of California's Napa Valley.  Wine varieties grown include Cabernet Sauvignon, Chardonnay, Pinot noir, and Merlot.

History
The winery was founded by two men who were born into the French wine business, John Goelet and Bernard Portet.  After scouting the world for two years to locate areas where they might produce Bordeaux-style wine, Portet identified the then-undiscovered Stag’s Leap district of California’s Napa Valley as especially promising.  Goelet bought  of vineyard land and established the winery in 1972.  The next year he bought  in the Los Carneros region to produce the Burgundian varieties Pinot noir and Chardonnay.

Awards

The winery received international recognition when its first vintage of Cabernet Sauvignon  (1972) achieved eighth place in the Judgment of Paris.

In the French Culinary Institute Wine Tasting of 1986, Clos Du Val Winery won first place.

In The Judgment of Paris 30th Anniversary, the judges awarded Clos du Val fifth place.

References

Further reading
Taber, George M. Judgment of Paris: California vs. France and the Historic 1976 Paris Tasting that revolutionized wine. NY: Scribner, 2005.

External links

 Clos du Val Winery
The Judgment of Paris

Wineries in Napa Valley
Food and drink companies established in 1972
Companies based in Napa County, California
Goelet family
1972 establishments in California